Isaac Pinto (1720–1791) was an important American Jew in Colonial America.

Pinto prepared the first Jewish prayer-book published in America, which was also the first English translation of the Siddur.

 Was one of the signers of the Non-Importation Act in 1770.
 Was friends with Ezra Stiles, President of Yale College.
 Served as one of the first official translators hired by the United States government in 1781 under authorization of the Continental Congress working in the Department of Foreign Affairs, the predecessor to the modern Department of State.
 Was member of Congregation Shearith Israel, the  oldest Jewish congregation in America.

References

External links
 

American Sephardic Jews
1720 births
1791 deaths